In is graveyard or cemetery. Qabar means grave. There are total 203 graveyards in Karachi. Of them, 184 are for Muslims and 19 for non-Muslims. 90 fall under the control of City District Government Karachi, while 106 are looked after by societies such as the DHA, PQA, CAA and Steel Mills.

List of cemeteries in Karachi

Historical

 Chaukhandi Tombs
 Karachi War Cemetery

General

Muslims
 C1 Area Graveyard, Liaquatabad Town
 Al Fatah Graveyard, Karachi
 Ali Bagh Graveyard, Naya Abad Liyari
 Azeemia Graveyard, Surjani Town
 Azeempura Cemetery, Shah Faisal Colony
 Bagh-e-Ahmed (AMC Karachi Chapter Cemetery)
 Bangali Para Grave Yard 
 Boor Bagh Qabrastan,
 Chhipa Qabrastsn, SITE Town
 Children's Graveyard, Jamshed Town
 Defence View Graveyard, Clifton Cantonment
 Essa Nagri Graveyard, Main Sir Shah Suleman Road (officially declared closed)
• Fauji Qabrastan, D.H.A.
 Gizri Cemetery, D.H.A.
 Graveyard, Landhi Town 
 Graveyard (University of Karachi)
 Grave Yards of Kaneez Fatima Society, Surjani Town
 Gulshan-e_Latif sec9, (Korangi Town
 Haji Mohd Sarbazi _Qabrastan, SITE Town
 Ibrahim Hydri Graveyard, Korangi Town
 Ismail Goth Graveyard, Landhi No.2

 Jamaat-e-Gujrati Saudagaran Graveyard, Baldia Town
 Jannatul Baqi Cemetery, Hub River Road, S.I.T.E.
 Jannat-ul-Baqee Graveyard, Orangi Town
 Katchi Sonara Qabristan, Baldia Town
 Khajji Ground Graveyard, Liaquatabad Town
 Khamosh Colony Graveyard, Liaquatabad Town
Bagh e Korangi QabristanLandhi Town
 Khoja Graveyard, Karachi
 Korangi 6 Graveyard, Korangi Town
 Khursheed Pura Graveyad,
 Leemo Goth Graveyard, Haji Leemo Goth, Gulshan-e-Iqbal
 Masoom Shah Small Graveyard, Jamshed Town
 Mahmoodabad Graveyard, Jamshed Town
Meeran Maa Graveyard
 Metroville III Graveyard, Metroville III, Gulshan-e-Iqbal
Mewashah Cemetery (officially declared closed)
 Mewa Shah Graveyard, Karachi
 Mian Goth Cemetery, Malir Town
 Miran Pir Graveyard, Lyari Town
 Moachh Graveyard, Baldia Town
 Model Colony Cemetery (New), Malir Town
 Model Colony Cemetery (Old), Malir Town
 Mohajir Camp Graveyard, Karachi
 Muhammad Shah Grave Yard, North Karachi
 New Graveyard, Bin Qasim Town
 New Karachi Cemetery, New Karachi
 Noorani Graveyard, Korangi Town
 Old Morraro Cemetery, S.I.T.E.
 P.E.C.H.S. Cemetery, Tariq Road (officially declared closed)
 Pakistan Steel Graveyard, Bin Qasim Town
 Paposh Nagar Graveyard (officially declared closed)
Sakhi Hassan Cemetery, North Nazimabad (officially declared closed)
 Peer Bukhari Graveyard, Mannoo Goth, Gulshan-e-Iqbal
 Pehalwan Goth Graveyard, Pehalwan Goth, Gulistan-e-Johar
 Qabrastan No.5, Bin Qasim Town
 Qasbah Colony Graveyard, North Nazimabad
 Qayyumabad Graveyard, Clifton Cantonment
 Rehri Graveyard,  
 Saudabad Cemetery, Malir Town (officially declared closed)
 Shafiq Pura Graveyard - Palm Grove Baldia Town
 Shah Faisal Cemetery(Colony Gate), Shahrah-e-Faisal (officially declared closed)
 Shanti Nagar Graveyard, Dalmia Road, Shanti Nagar
 Sindhi, Graveyard, Liaquatabad Town
 Mula Bux Graveyard, Redhi Goth, Landhi Town
 Wadi-e-Hussain Cemetery, Super Highway  (Wadi-e-Hussain.com)
 Zia Colony Graveyard, Orangi Town

Christian
 Azam Town Graveyard, Jamshed Town
 Christian Graveyard, Landhi Town
 Christians Cemetery, Malir Town
 Christian Cemetery, Orangi Town
 Christian Cemetery 2, Orangi Town
 Gora Qabaristan, Shahrah-e-Faisal.

Jewish
 Bani Israel Graveyard

Others
Karachi World War 2 Cemetery Faisal Cantonment
Naval Cemetery Faisal Cantonment

Zoroastrian (Parsi)
Tower of Silence, Mehmoodabad

Famous mausoleums

 Abdullah Shah Ghazi Mazar, Clifton (mausoleum of Karachi's Sufi Saint)
 Mazar-e-Quaid, M.A. Jinnah Road Final resting place of Muhammad Ali Jinnah, Founder of Pakistan.

See also
British Association for Cemeteries in South Asia
 List of cemeteries
 List of mausoleums

References

External links
 Graveyards — a neglected social issue - Review DAWN.com
 Graveyards in Gulshan-e-Iqbal Town
 Jewish Graveyard

Cemeteries in Karachi
Cemeteries
Karachi